Simla is a statutory town in Elbert County, Colorado, United States. The population was 601 at the time of the 2020 United States Census.

History
Simla was founded in 1909 by a man with the name of Altman. Simla was named because the daughter of a railroad official was reading a book about India when she came across the name, Simla. Settled in the 1880s, Simla was incorporated in 1912. The first newspaper was started in 1911. It was a center for the shipping of the area's potato harvest each year.

Simla received national attention when it became the place where the first so-called "English Variant" of SARS-COV-2 (Covid-19 virus) was diagnosed in the United States.

Geography
Simla is located in southern Elbert County at  (39.140746, -104.082836). It lies to the south of Big Sandy Creek, an east-flowing tributary of the Arkansas River. U.S. Route 24 passes through the town, leading southwest to Colorado Springs and northeast  to Limon.

Demographics

As of the census of 2000, there were 663 people, 233 households, and 171 families residing in the town. The racial makeup of the town was 94.27% White, 0.45% African American, 1.96% Native American, 0.30% Asian, 1.21% from other races, and 1.81% from two or more races. Hispanic or Latino of any race were 3.62% of the population.

There were 233 households, out of which 40.3% had children under the age of 18 living with them, 56.7% were married couples living together, 13.3% had a female householder with no husband present, and 26.2% were non-families. 21.5% of all households were made up of individuals, and 10.7% had someone living alone who was 65 years of age or older. The average household size was 2.73 and the average family size was 3.24.

In the town, the population was spread out, with 32.4% under the age of 18, 7.7% from 18 to 24, 28.1% from 25 to 44, 16.4% from 45 to 64, and 15.4% who were 65 years of age or older. The median age was 34 years. For every 100 females, there were 93.3 males. For every 100 females age 18 and over, there were 87.4 males.

The median income for a household in the town was $31,382, and the median income for a family was $31,953. Males had a median income of $28,250 versus $21,458 for females. The per capita income for the town was $13,099. About 10.3% of families and 17.2% of the population were below the poverty line, including 26.0% of those under age 18 and 4.6% of those age 65 or over.

Big Sandy High School
Big Sandy High School in Simla has a tradition of athletic success. The Simla Cubs have won 11 team state championships: 5 football, 2 boys basketball, two girls basketball, two girls volleyball, and one boys track and field, as well as several individual state champions.

Notable athletes from Simla include Glenn Morris, gold medal winner of the 1936 Olympic decathlon, as well as Barry Helton, former professional football player in the NFL.

See also

 List of municipalities in Colorado

References

External links

 
 CDOT map of Simla

Towns in Elbert County, Colorado
Towns in Colorado